Charnock Richard is a civil parish in the Borough of Chorley, Lancashire, England.   The parish contains 12 buildings that are recorded in the National Heritage List for England as designated listed buildings. Of these, two are listed at Grade II*, the middle grade, and the others are at Grade II, the lowest grade.  Apart from the village of Charnock Richard, the parish is rural.  Most of the listed buildings are, or originated as, farmhouses and farm buildings.  The other listed buildings consist of a church, a bridge, a school and schoolmaster's house, and almshouses with associated buildings.

Key

Buildings

References

Citations

Sources

Lists of listed buildings in Lancashire
Buildings and structures in the Borough of Chorley